Arthur C. Parkes was an English professional footballer.

Career 
Parkes played for both FC Sète and Club Français in France. In 1922, he was brought over to the country along with fellow countryman Billy Cornelius by Victor Gibson. With Sète, he played in the 1923 Coupe de France Final where the club was defeated by Red Star Olympique. In 1931, Parkes joined Club Français and won the Coupe de France in his first season. In 1932, he played in France's first-ever professional league championship.

References 

Year of birth missing
Year of death missing
English footballers
English football managers
Club Français players
FC Sète 34 players
Association football midfielders